By-elections were held on February 8, 2007, in Ontario, Canada, to fill three vacancies in the Legislative Assembly of Ontario. By-elections were held in three electoral districts (ridings): Burlington, Markham and York South–Weston.

The by-elections resulted in York South-Weston being taken by the NDP from the Liberals, Burlington remaining Progressive Conservative and Markham being retained by the Liberals.

Since this was a by-election of the 38th Legislative Assembly of Ontario, the ridings used the same boundaries as the 2003 general election. The subsequent October 10, 2007 general election were run on new electoral district boundaries, mostly following the new federal boundaries that were in place for the 2004 and 2006 federal elections.

Burlington electoral district 
The Burlington by-election was called following the resignation of Progressive Conservative Member of Provincial Parliament (MPP) Cam Jackson. He resigned to make a successful run in Burlington's 2006 mayoralty election.
.

Information about candidates and parties

Markham electoral district 
The Markham by-election was called following the resignation of Liberal MPP Tony Wong. He resigned to make a successful run for one of the four York Region councillor seats in Markham's 2006 municipal election.

Information about candidates and parties

York South–Weston electoral district 

The York South–Weston by-election was called following the resignation of Liberal MPP Joe Cordiano. He stated the reason for his resignation was the need to spend more time with his family.

Information about candidates and parties.

See also
List of Ontario by-elections
38th Legislative Assembly of Ontario
Politics of Ontario
List of Ontario political parties
Premier of Ontario
Leader of the Opposition (Ontario)
2007 Ontario general election

References

External links

Government and political parties
 Elections Ontario
 Family Coalition Party of Ontario
 Freedom Party of Ontario
 Ontario Green Party website
 Ontario Liberal Party website
 Libertarian Party of Ontario
 Ontario New Democratic Party (NDP) website
 Ontario Progressive Conservative Party website

News reports and articles
 Halton Region Online News
Years of In-Action on Health Care results in a Lack of Regional Hospital similar to Peel Region's Credit Valley
Why Have Two Former Halton Regional Councillors now Provincial Candidates in Burlington Allowed This?
 Do Two former Burlington Regional Councillors Really Have the Answer to Gridlock?
Toronto Star, "Does Past GO Transit Board member & now Provincial Candidate Really Have Solutions?"

2007 elections in Canada
Provincial by-elections in Ontario
By-elections